Institut supérieur des matériaux du Mans (ISMANS) a French engineering College created in 1987.

The school trains engineers in the field of transport (motorsport, automotive, aeronautics, aerospace, rail).

Located in Le Mans the school is a member of the Conférence des Grandes Écoles (CGE).

Since 2016, it is part of the CESI group.

References

External links
 ISMANS

Engineering universities and colleges in France
Le Mans
ISMANS
Sarthe
Educational institutions established in 1987
1987 establishments in France